Horné Mýto (until 1899 ) is a village and municipality in the Dunajská Streda District in the Trnava Region of southwest Slovakia.

Geography
The municipality lies at an altitude of 110 metres and covers an area of 12.107 km².

History
In the 9th century, the territory of Horné Mýto became part of the Great Moravia. In 11th it was within Kingdom of Hungary.
In historical records, the village was first mentioned in 1406. Until the end of World War I, it was part of Hungary and fell within the Dunaszerdahely district of Pozsony County. After the Austro-Hungarian army disintegrated in November 1918, Czechoslovakian troops liberated the whole area of southern Slovakia including the village. This was confirmed with victory powers France, Great Britain and USA. After Hungary forced to agree and sign the Treaty of Trianon of 1920, it recognized officially the village as part of Czechoslovakia and fell within Bratislava County until 1927. In November 1938, the First Vienna Award returned the area to Hungary due to the Hungarian majority. After the occupation of soviets, they gave back the village to the Czechoslovakians. After WWII, First Vienna Award has been declared as never-valid agreement, confirming illegality of Hungarian occupation. After anti-nazi army liberated area in 1945, Czechoslovakian administration returned and the village became officially part of Czechoslovakia in 1947. In 1960, it was unified with the neighboring Trhová Hradská (Vásárút) under the name of  Trhové Mýto, however, since 1990, both have formed independent municipalities again.

Demography 
At the 2001 Census the recorded population of the village was 969 while an end-2008 estimate by the Statistical Office had the villages's population as 981. As of 2001, 97.21% of its population were Hungarians, while 2.48% were Slovaks.

According to the 2021 census, the village population has decreased to 905 people. The share of Hungarians was 85.19% and the share of Slovaks 12.6%.

Roman Catholicism is the majority religion of the village, its adherents numbering 96.18% of the total population.

See also
 List of municipalities and towns in Slovakia

References

Genealogical resources

The records for genealogical research are available at the state archive "Statny Archiv in Bratislava, Slovakia"
 Roman Catholic church records (births/marriages/deaths): 1669-1895 (parish B)

External links
Surnames of living people in Horne Myto

Villages and municipalities in Dunajská Streda District
Hungarian communities in Slovakia